Simo Arttur Rundgren (born 28 June 1953 in Kolari, Finland) is a Finnish politician. He was elected to the Finnish Parliament from Lapland (electoral district) in 2003 and again in 2011. He has a master's degree in Theology and he has worked as a pastor/vicar from 1982 to 1993 and again from 1997 to 2003. Rundgren worked as an Executive Director of  Finnish Centre Youth from 1974 to 1976.

References

1953 births
Living people
People from Kolari
20th-century Finnish Lutheran clergy
Centre Party (Finland) politicians
Members of the Parliament of Finland (2003–07)
Members of the Parliament of Finland (2011–15)